The Standoff at Sparrow Creek is a 2018 American thriller film written and directed by Henry Dunham, in his feature debut.

The film premiered at the 2018 Toronto International Film Festival in September 2018, and was released in the United States on January 18, 2019.

Plot
Gannon, an ex-police officer, is eating a meal one night, when he hears automatic gun shots and explosions in the distance. Listening to a police radio, he hears news that there is a gunman opening fire at a police funeral, and that the suspect has fled on foot. Gannon drives to a secluded warehouse where he meets 6 other members of a local militia of which he is a member. They discover one of the rifles in the armory is missing, as well as body armor and grenades, confirming someone in the group is the gunman. They resolve to stay in the warehouse all night until they can find out which of them carried out the shooting; none of the members will admit. The group's prime suspects are Morris, a former member of the Aryan Brotherhood, and Keating, a young man who never speaks.

While Beckmann mans the radio equipment and a fish tracker to see if anyone is approaching the warehouse, Gannon speaks to Noah, who he knows is an undercover officer assigned to the militia, and resolves to keep him safe through the investigation. Gannon first interrogates Morris, who admits to the shooting as revenge for the police covering up the rape and killing of his daughter, but the militia's de facto leader Ford intervenes, telling Gannon that Morris is lying to bring attention to his daughter's murder. Ford suspects Noah, whom he threatens to kill if he doesn't admit to the shooting.

Beckmann hears over the radio that more militia shootings are taking place, inspired by the initial shooting, and attempts to broadcast that their militia has nothing to do with the shooting, to no avail. Keating finally speaks to Gannon, saying he doesn't speak because he prefers to be alone; Gannon reads from Keating's journal, in which he professes a desire to shoot up his school, and Keating neither confirms or denies that he carried out the shooting. Gannon decides that he needs to die in order to give the police a scapegoat, citing an incident where he was forced to kill his partner in order to maintain his cover and give the police a reason to arrest members of the Ku Klux Klan, but before he can shoot himself, Keating admits to the shooting and confesses over the radio. However, the police believe the confession to be false, mentioning that they've received multiple confessions in the last hour.

Ford believes Gannon is protecting Noah, who he feels connected with through their mutual history as police officers, and strings Noah up from a noose in the warehouse. However, the execution is interrupted by the arrival of a squad of police cars. Gannon and Noah both exit the warehouse and surrender to the police, as Gannon tells Ford to tell the police that they both carried out the shooting. The rest of the militia confront the police, armed with rifles and wearing body armor, but as soon as one of them makes a move, the police open fire, killing all of the members except the surrendering Gannon and Noah. Noah then admits that the police faked the shootings to get the militia to distrust each other and give his squad a reason to eliminate the militia. Gannon almost shoots Noah, but relents and gives him his gun, letting him walk away. The police ask Gannon if he wants to rejoin them; the film cuts to black before he decides.

Cast
 James Badge Dale as Gannon
 Brian Geraghty as Noah
 Patrick Fischler as Beckmann
 Happy Anderson as Morris
 Robert Aramayo as Keating
 Gene Jones as Hubbel
 Chris Mulkey as Ford
 Bret Porter as Kowalski
 Cotter Smith as Roman
 Nichole Abshire as Police Officer

Release
The film premiered at the 2018 Toronto International Film Festival in September 2018, and was released in the United States on January 18, 2019.

Reception
The website's critics consensus reads: "Taut and unpredictable, The Standoff at Sparrow Creek should satisfy suspense fans in the mood for a well-told story topped with a generous helping of violence." Brian Tallerico of RogerEbert.com gave the film 3.5 out of 4 stars stating "Dunham displays a remarkable skill when it comes to using limited space, trapping his characters in a warehouse on a life-changing night". Bilge Ebiri of Vulture.com described the film as a "memorable feature". Adam Graham of The Detroit News called film a "sharp debut from writer-director Henry Dunham".

See also

References

External links
 
 

2018 films
2018 thriller drama films
American thriller drama films
2018 thriller films
2010s English-language films
2010s American films